I'll Be There may refer to:

Music

Songs 
 "I'll Be There" (Arashi song), 2017
 "I'll Be There" (Bobby Darin song), 1960, notably covered by Gerry and the Pacemakers (1965) and Elvis Presley (1970)
 "I'll Be There" (Bright song), 2008
 "I'll Be There" (Chic song), 2015
 "I'll Be There" (Emma Bunton song), 2003
 "I'll Be There" (The Escape Club song), 1991
 "I'll Be There" (Jackson 5 song), 1970, notably covered as a duet by Mariah Carey and Trey Lorenz (1992)
 "I'll Be There" (Jess Glynne song), 2018
 "I'll Be There" (Tiffany Evans song), 2010
 "I'll Be There (If You Ever Want Me)", by Ray Price, 1954
 "I'll Be There", by Alisa Xayalith, 2022
 "I'll Be There", by Boyfriend, 2011
 "I'll Be There", by Boyzone from Said and Done, 1995
 "I'll Be There", by Damita Jo DeBlanc, 1961
 "I'll Be There", by Eternal from Always & Forever, 1993
 "I'll Be There", by Hardline from Double Eclipse, 1992
 "I'll Be There", by Hollywood Undead from Day of the Dead, 2015
 "I'll Be There", by Kumi Koda, a B-side from "4 Hot Wave", 2006
 "I'll Be There", by Loona from HyunJin, 2016
 "I'll Be There", by Mac Miller from Best Day Ever, 2011
 "I'll Be There", by Megadeth from Risk, 1999
 "I'll Be There", by the Neales, 2016
 "I'll Be There", by Phil Ochs from A Toast to Those Who Are Gone, 1986
 "I'll Be There", by Pretty Maids from Stripped, 1993
 "I'll Be There", by Sarah Geronimo, 2008
 "I'll Be There", by Stunt, 2009
 "I'll Be There", by Sweetbox from Greatest Hits, 2007
 "I'll Be There", by Taeyang from Solar, 2010
 "I'll Be There", by Walk off the Earth, 2019
 "I'll Be There", the theme to The Election, performed by Eva Chan, 2014
 "I'll Be There (When You Get Lonely)", by Ray Price, 1957
 "Truly Julie's Blues (I'll Be There)", by Bob Lind, 1966

Albums 
 I'll Be There (Ki-Yo album), 2001
 I'll Be There, by Gloria Gaynor, 1994
 I'll Be There, by Si Kahn, 1989

Other media 
 I'll Be There (2003 film), a film starring Charlotte Church and Craig Ferguson
 I'll Be There (2010 film), a Filipino film starring Gabby Concepcion and KC Concepcion
 I'll Be There (novel), a novel by Iris Rainer Dart

See also
 I Will Be There (disambiguation)
 "I'll Be Around" (The Spinners song)
 I'll Be There for You (disambiguation) 
 "Reach Out I'll Be There", a 1966 song by the Four Tops